The Heart Buster is a lost 1924 American silent Western film directed by Jack Conway and starring Tom Mix and Esther Ralston. It was produced by and distributed by Fox Film Corporation.

Cast
 Tom Mix as Tod Walton
 Esther Ralston as Rose Hillyer
 Cyril Chadwick as Edward Gordon
 William Courtright as Justice of the peace
 Frank Currier as John Hillyer
 Tom Wilson as George

References

External links

 
 

1924 films
Lost Western (genre) films
Films directed by Jack Conway
Fox Film films
1924 Western (genre) films
Lost American films
Silent films in color
1924 lost films
Silent American Western (genre) films
1920s American films